The following is a list of countries and territories that have Italian as an official language.

Sovereign states

Country subdivisions

See also
 Language geography
 Geolinguistics

References